Ross Tierney is an Irish footballer who plays as a midfielder for Scottish Premiership side Motherwell.

Club career

Bohemians
Tierney spent his youth career with St. Kevin's Boys (which was amalgamated with Bohemians in 2018) from the age of eight. Having progressed through the Bohs-SKB U17s and U19s teams, Tierney came to prominence in the second half of the 2019 season with his displays.

He made his first-team debut in the League of Ireland Cup Quarter Final clash with Cork City in May 2019, scoring the opening goal in a 2–0 win. He struck a further three times during his rookie season, hitting the net against UCD, Dundalk and Waterford.

He made his first ever UEFA Europa Conference League appearance for Bohs against Stjarnan in July 2021 and scored his first European goal against F91 Dudelange two weeks later.

After notching seven goals and fifteen assists during the 2021 campaign, Tierney, alongside teammate Dawson Devoy and UCD's Colm Whelan, was nominated for the PFAI Young Player of the Year award.

Motherwell
On 1 December 2021, Tierney signed with Motherwell for an undisclosed fee on a three-and-a-half year deal. He completed the move on 1 January 2022. Tierney made his debut for the club on 22 January 2022 in a Scottish Cup tie against Greenock Morton, coming off the bench in the 76th minute and winning a penalty as his side won 2–1 in extra time. His first goal for Motherwell came on 1 February where he netted a 92nd minute equaliser in a 1-1 draw against St Mirren.
His second goal came at home to Rangers, after which he cupped his ears and put his finger  to his mouth in an aid to goad the away support. Motherwell went on to lose the game 3-1.

International career 
On 29 May 2021, Tierney was called up to the Republic of Ireland Under-21s squad. He made his debut in a friendly against the Australia U23s on 2 June 2021, coming off the bench to score a last-minute winner with his first touch. On 29 March 2022, he opened the scoring in a 2–0 win away to Sweden U21 in the 2023 UEFA European Under-21 Championship qualifiers, on his 7th cap for the U21s.

Style of play 
Despite his small stature, Tierney has been praised for his skill, footballing IQ, and courage by many news outlets.

Career statistics

References 

2001 births
Living people
Association footballers from County Dublin
Association footballers from Dublin (city)
Republic of Ireland association footballers
Bohemian F.C. players
Motherwell F.C. players
League of Ireland players
Scottish Professional Football League players
Association football midfielders
Republic of Ireland youth international footballers
Republic of Ireland under-21 international footballers
Irish expatriate sportspeople in Scotland
Expatriate footballers in Scotland
Irish expatriate association footballers
People educated at St Aidan's C.B.S.
St. Kevin's Boys F.C. players